Dar Giaban may refer to:
 Dar Giaban, Iranshahr
 Dar Giaban, Zahedan